Kalasala Babu (1950  14 May 2018) was an Indian actor who performed on stage, and in television serials and films.

On stage
Babu had been acting in radio plays while at college.  Following his graduation in 1973, Babu acted in Paanchajanyam, yielding a good performance.  Babu acted at Kalidasa Kala Kendram for two years, and was offered roles by the late O. Madhavan and K. T. Muhammed.

After acting in his first film Inayethedi in 1977, Babu started his drama troupe 'Kalasala' in Thripunithura, which had artists such as Thilakan and Surasu, amongst others.  The troupe began with the play Thalavattom, scripted by Surasu, which became a big hit.  In total, nine plays were conducted and scripted by renowned personalities such as P. J. Antony, Sreemoolanagaram Vijayan, N. N. Pillai and others.  The troupe operated until 1980.

Later on, he also worked with theatre company Chalakudy Sarathy for a few years.

Film and television 
Babu got his first opportunity in film in 1977, in Inayethedi, the first venture of John Paul, George Kitho, Kaloor Dennis and Antony Eastman.  He was cast alongside Silk Smitha for this film, which became a flop.

Towards the end of 1999, Babu was cast in Kala, a 13-episode television serial. His role of the character, Rowdy Dasappan, was well received by viewers. Following this, Babu acted in around 28 mega-serials over the next three years.

Babu made his way back into cinema with Kasthooriman in 2003, afterwards acting in character and villain roles in many movies, and achieved recognition for his performances, comfortably filling the acting space left vacant by late character actors such as N. F. Varghese and Narendra Prasad.
He became more popular in the film Lion as father of Dileep. Babu acted in the popular Malayalam serial Amma as retired judge Poomankalathe Gopinatha Menon, which was daily telecast on Asianet channel from 2012 to 2015. He was paired with Kanya Bharathi and later replaced by Mammootty's brother. He also did a Malayalam serial named Sooryakaladi, which is telecasting on Amrita.

Personal life
Babu was born to Kathakali maestro Kalamandalam Krishnan Nair and Mohiniyattam exponent Kalamandalam Kalyanikutty Amma. He belonged to a family of artists. His sisters Sreedevi Rajan and Kala Vijayan, and his niece Smitha Rajan are Mohiniyattam artists.

He was married to Lalitha and had a son named Viswanathan and a daughter named Sreedevi.

On 18 January 2018, the 68-year old Babu was admitted at Amrita Hospital in Kochi after suffering a heart attack. As per reports, he became critical when he had a stroke during the emergency surgery, followed by the heart attack. Later, he was admitted to Medical Trust Hospital, where he died at 12:35 AM on 14 May 2018.

Filmography

Deadline (2021) Movie shot in 2017 but released through OTT Platform Moviflex on 16 February 2021, and also through Theater Play OTT Platform on 1 June 2021. As an actor it is his last movie release
Kalippu (2019) 
Arayakadavil (2019)
Parole (2018) as Judge
Shirkh (2018)
Aashiq Vanna Divasam (2018) as Chacko
Queen (2018) as Judge
Nilavariyathe (2017)
Nee Maathram Saakshi (2017)
Sunday Holiday (2017) as Unni's father
Sivapuram (2016)
Oppam (2016)
Noolpalam (2016)
Tharakangale Saakshi (2015)
Ithinumappuram (2015) as Rugmini's father
Samrajyam II: Son of Alexander (2015) as Bomb Bhaskaran
Two Countries (2015) as Ullas's father
One Day (2015) as Sivan Pillai
Ariyathe Ishtamayi (2015)
Flat No.4B (2014) as Military Retired
Kuruthamkettavan (2014)
Njaanannu Party (2014)
Life (2014)
Ginger (2013) as Pappachan 
ABCD: American-Born Confused Desi (2013) as Chief Minister
Ayaal (2013) as Vaasu
Malayala Nadu (2013)
Cowboy (2013)
Teens (2013)
Progress Report (2013) as Govindan Nair
Dolls (2013) as Raghava Kaimal
Housefull (2013)
Lisammayude Veedu (2013)
Isaac Newton S/O Philipose (2013)
Aattakatha (2013) as Ravunni Nair
Sound Thoma (2013) as Vikariyachan
Asuravithu (2012)
Lakshmi Vilasam Renuka Makan Reghuraman (2012)
Nadabrahmam (2012)
Chattakkari (2012)
Naughty Professor (2012)
Mullamottum Munthiricharum (2012)
Rasaleela (2012)
Mallu Singh (2012)
Koratty Pattanam Railway Gate (2011)
Manushyamrugam (2011)
Sevenes (2011)
Payyans (2011)
Collector (2011)
The Metro (2011) as Viswan
Chekavar (2010) as Shekharan
Pokkiri Raja (2010)
Nayakan (2010) as Raman Kutty Master
Annarakannanum Thannalayathu (2010)
Neelambari (2010)
Koottukar (2010)
Kaaryasthan (2010)
Chaverpada (2010)
Chattambinadu (2009) as Kattapilli Kuruppachen
Thirunakkara Perumal (2009)
Black Dahlia (2009) as Sunny Kuruvila
Puthiya Mukham (2009)
Mayakazhcha (2008) as Vadakkemadam Thirumeni
College Kumaran (2008) as Public Prosecutor
Mission 90 Days (2007) as Commissioner
Rakshakan (2007)
Nanma (2007)
Inspector Garud (2007) as Achuthan
Avan Chandiyude Makan (2007) as Kunjukochan
Kanaka Simhasanam (2006)
Pothan Vava (2006) as Priest
Chess (2006) as Doctor
Pachakuthira (2006)
Mahasamudram (2006)
Kisan (2006) as Education Minister
Thuruppu Gulan (2006) as Sreedharan Unnithan
Madhuchandralekha (2006) as Ramu
Lion (2006) as Balagangadhara Menon
Sarkkar Dada (2005)
Anandabhadram (2005)
Ben Johnson (2005) Chandranthodi Madhava Menon
Lokanathan IAS (2005) as Koya
Rappakal (2005) as Shekharan
Made in USA (2005)
Kalyana Kurimanam (2005) as Shiva Sankaran
Thommanum Makkalum (2005) as Thevar
The Campus (2005) as Fr. David Pulikkattil
Ullam (2005) as Raman Nair
Nothing But Life (2004) as Father Daniel
Perumazhakkalam (2004) aa Krishna Iyer
Mambazhakkalam (2004)
Runway (2004) as Varkey Chinnadan
Vajram (2004) as Shankaran
Freedom (2004)
Sasneham Sumithra (2004) as Kurup
Ente Veedu Appuvinteyum (2003) as Meera's father
Balettan (2003)
Varum Varunnu Vannu (2003) as Narendra Varma
Kasthooriman (2003)
Ivar (2003)
Chathurangam (2002)
Varaphalam (1994)
Pattanapravesham (1988) as Sub-Inspector
Ariyaatha Veethikal (1984) as Raghavan
Kochu Kochu Thettukal (1980)
Sreemurukan (1977) as Sukumaran
Inayethedi (1977)

Television serials (partial)

References

External links

Kalasala Babu at MSI

1950 births
2018 deaths
20th-century Indian male actors
21st-century Indian male actors
Indian male film actors
Indian male television actors
Male actors from Kerala
Male actors in Malayalam television
Male actors in Malayalam cinema
People from Kannur district